Karen Ann Smyers (born October 31, 1954) is an American academic with a special interest in Japan. She has also developed a second career as a Jungian analyst.

Early life
Smyers earned her undergraduate degree at Smith College and she earned her Ph.D. in Anthropology from Princeton University.  Her doctoral thesis was entitled "The fox and the jewel: a study of shared and private meanings in Japanese Inari worship."  She is known as an expert on Inari Ōkami and Inari-related literature.

Career
Smyers taught in the Religion Department at Wesleyan University.

Jungian analyst
In 2001, Smyers enrolled in the Jung Institute in Zürich, Switzerland.  In 2007, she was awarded a diploma from the International School of Analytical Psychology (ISAP).  She established a practice as a Jungian analyst in Hadley, Massachusetts.

Smyers became the President of the Western Massachusetts Association of Jungian Psychology.

Selected works
In a statistical overview derived from writings by and about Karen Ann Smyers, OCLC/WorldCat encompasses roughly 3 works in 10+ publications in 1 language and 300+ library holdings.

 The Fox and the Jewel: a Study of Shared and Private Meanings in Japanese Inari Worship (1993)

Articles
 "'My Own Inari' - Personalization of the Deity in the Inari Worship," Japanese Journal of Religious Studies, Vol. 23, No. 1-2 (1996), pp. 85–116.

Notes

External links
  Smyers' website

Historians of Japan
American Japanologists
Wesleyan University faculty
Living people
1954 births